Kopps is a 2003 Swedish action comedy film which was released to cinemas in Sweden on 7 February 2003, directed by Josef Fares. The name itself is a pun on pronouncing the English word "Cops" with a Swedish accent.

Plot 
The film concerns the police force of a small fictional Swedish village, Högboträsk. The village is so peaceful that crime has become nonexistent. The police spend their shifts drinking coffee, eating hot dogs and chasing down runaway cows. This is all well and good for the village's own police, but the police management board wants to discontinue the local police force for lack of crime. This would mean the loss of income for the policemen, so they begin to stage crimes in order to preserve their jobs. This includes burning down the local hotdog stand, hiring a drunk to steal a packet of sausages, thrashing a local car, faking a shootout and staging a kidnapping using their friends as actors.

Cast 
 Fares Fares - Jacob
 Torkel Petersson - Benny
 Göran Ragnerstam - Lasse
 Sissela Kyle - Agneta
 Eva Röse - Jessica Lindblad
Christian Fiedler - Folke
 Erik Ahrnbom - Håkan
 Harry Goldstein - Göran
 Michael Fares - Mike
 Viktor Friberg - Janne
 Jan Fares - Mike's father
 Yngve Dahlberg - Gunnar
 Kerstin Hellström - Kindergarten teacher

American remake 
Shortly after Kopps' release in 2003, Adam Sandler and Columbia Pictures bought the rights and announced their plans to remake the comedy into an English-language release, though the status is currently unknown.

See also 
Super Troopers
Parable of the broken window

References

External links
 
 
 

2003 films
Swedish action comedy films
2000s Swedish-language films
Films directed by Josef Fares
2003 action comedy films
2003 comedy films
2000s Swedish films